Karel Václav Klíč (sometimes written Karl Klietsch, 30 May 1841, Hostinné – 16 November 1926, Vienna) was a Czech painter, photographer, early comics artist, caricaturist, lithographer and illustrator. He was one of the inventors of photogravure (heliogravura in Czech).

Klíč had such artistic talent that he was admitted into the Art Academy in Prague at the age of 14. For ridiculing school officials he was soon expelled, but eventually finished the school in 1862. Klíč worked as a photographer, caricaturist and illustrator in Brno, Budapest and Vienna, all the time trying to improve the technology of picture reproduction. During a long night in 1877, while working with zinc relief etching, he discovered, by chance, a process leading to photogravure. He further improved the process in 1890, when working in England.

Sources

External links

 Lambiek Comiclopedia article.
 Very short biography
 Biography (in Czech)
 Description of photogravure

1841 births
1926 deaths
People from Hostinné
People from the Kingdom of Bohemia
Czech illustrators
Czech lithographers
Czech caricaturists
Czech comics artists
Czech inventors
19th-century Czech painters
Czech male painters
20th-century Czech painters
19th-century Czech male artists
20th-century Czech male artists